Patrizio Sumbu Kalambay (born 10 April 1956) is a Congolese-born Italian former professional boxer. A world champion and two-time title challenger, he held the WBA world middleweight title from 1987 until 1988.

Personal life
Kalambay was born in the Belgian Congo. He moved to Italy during his youth, settling in Chiaravalle, in the Marche region, where he learned boxing and still resides. He changed his name to Patrizio as a tribute to fellow Italian boxer Patrizio Oliva.

Professional career
After compiling an amateur record of 90 wins and 5 losses, Kalambay turned professional in 1980. In 1985, he was outpointed over ten rounds by Duane Thomas in Atlantic City, New Jersey, United States. Kalambay won the Italian middleweight title by defeating Giovanni De Marco by split decision, then lost to former WBA light middleweight champion Ayub Kalule by split decision over twelve rounds for the European middleweight title.

In May 1987 at The Arena, Wembley, London, Kalambay won the European middleweight title by outpointing Herol Graham, who was 38-0 and ranked #1 in the world.

In his next fight, Kalambay defeated future three-weight world champion Iran Barkley by unanimous decision over fifteen rounds to win the vacant WBA middleweight title. He made three successful title defenses, including an upset unanimous decision win over Mike McCallum, the undefeated former WBA light middleweight champion.

In March 1989, at the Hilton Hotel, Las Vegas, Nevada, United States, he boxed undefeated IBF middleweight champion Michael Nunn, being stripped of the WBA belt prior to the bout. Surprisingly, Kalambay was knocked out in the first round with one punch. It was the only knock out loss of his career.

In 1990, Kalambay regained the European title by defeating Francesco Dell'Aquila, and defended it against Frederic Seillier, both via ninth round stoppages. In 1991, Kalambay had a rematch with McCallum in an attempt to regain the WBA middleweight title, which McCallum won by a close split decision.

Kalambay made four more successful defenses of the European title in Italy, including a rematch win over Herol Graham, and a points victory over future two-weight world champion Steve Collins.

In May 1993, at Granby Halls, Leicester, East Midlands, England, Kalambay lost by unanimous decision to Chris Pyatt in a challenge for the vacant WBO middleweight title.

At 37, Kalambay retired with a record of 57-6-1 (33 KOs). He then worked as a boxing trainer, coaching, among others, Paolo Vidoz and Michele Piccirillo.

Professional boxing record

Career after boxing
Sumbu Kalambay is currently the trainer of boxers Paolo Vidoz, Michele Piccirillo and Carel Sandon.

Family
He is the father of Patrick Kalambay, an Italian football midfielder.

See also
List of world middleweight boxing champions

References

Bibliography
 Gabriele Tinti, Sumbu Kalambay,Con l'Africa dentro, Milan, Mimesis, 2010.

External links

 

|-

|-

1956 births
Living people
Democratic Republic of the Congo male boxers
People from Lubumbashi
Democratic Republic of the Congo emigrants to Italy
Italian male boxers
Italian sportspeople of African descent
European Boxing Union champions
World middleweight boxing champions
World Boxing Association champions
The Ring (magazine) champions